James Harvey Robinson (June 29, 1863 – February 16, 1936) was an American scholar of history who, with Charles Austin Beard, founded New History, a disciplinary approach that attempts to use history to understand contemporary problems, which greatly broadened the scope of historical scholarship in relation to the social sciences.

Biography
Robinson was born in Bloomington, Illinois, to James Harvey Robinson (1808–1874), a bank president, and Latricia Maria Drake (1821–1908).  After traveling to Europe in 1882 Robinson entered Harvard University in 1884, earning his A.B. in 1887 and his M.A. in 1888. He continued his studies at the University of Strasbourg and the University of Freiburg and received his Ph.D. at Freiburg in 1890. In the summer of 1891, Robinson was appointed Lecturer of European history at what then was called the Wharton School of Finance, University of Pennsylvania. In 1895, he moved to Columbia University as a full professor, where he mentored numerous students who went on to become influential leaders in various fields, notably professorships around the United States.

Following some departures of faculty from Columbia over disputes of academic freedom – departures that included his friend Charles A. Beard – Robinson resigned from Columbia in May 1919 to become one of the founders of the New School for Social Research and serve as its first director.

Robinson died of a heart attack at his home in Manhattan. His body was interred at Bloomington, Illinois, in the Robinson family plot at the Evergreen Memorial Cemetery.

Notable works

New History
Through his writings and lectures, in which he stressed the "new history"—the social, scientific, and intellectual progress of humanity rather than merely political happenings, Robinson exerted an important influence on the study and teaching of history.  An editor (1892–1895) of the Annals of the American Academy of Political and Social Science, he was also an associate editor (1912–1920) of the American Historical Review, and, in 1929, succeeded James H. Breasted as President of the American Historical Association.

European history textbooks

Robinson's An Introduction to the History of Western Europe (1902, followed by several editions) was "The first textbook on European history which was reliable in scholarship, lively in tone, and penetrating in its interpretations.  It revolutionized the teaching of European history and put a whole generation of history students and history teachers in debt to the author." (Harry Elmer Barnes)

The Mind in the Making
Robinson's book, The Mind in the Making: The Relation of Intelligence to Social Reform (1921), was a bestseller, introducing a generation of readers to the intellectual world of higher education. It argues for freedom of thought as essential to progress. The book also postulated that people usually substituted rationalizations for reason.

The book and the New History movement itself was not without staunch critics. Classical scholar and foe to progressive treatises of history Paul Shorey (1857–1934), in a review of the book, declared:

The Human Comedy
Robinson's last book The Human Comedy: As Devised and Directed by Mankind Itself (1937) contains his mature reflections on history after a lifetime of study.

Other selected works
Books

  ; .
<div style="margin-left:2em">
<div style="margin-left:2em">
<div style="margin-left:2em">
{{Hanging indent |text={{cite book |title=Vol. 1' |publisher=Boston Ginn |url=https://archive.org/details/developmentofmod01robiuoft/page/n3/mode/2up |language=en-US }} }}
</div></div></div>
   (2nd ed.); .
  ; .
  ; .
<li> "The New History". .
<li> "The History of History"
<li> "The New Allies of History"
<li> "Some Reflections on Intellectual History"
<li> "History for the Common Man"
<li> "The Fall of Rome"
<li> "The Principles of 1789"
<li> "The Conservative Spirit in the Light of History"
  ; .

  ; .

 History of Europe: Ancient and Medieval (with James Henry Breasted), 1920 online edition
 History of Europe: Our Own Times: The Eighteenth and Eineteenth Centuries: The Opening of the Twentieth Century and the World War  (with Charles A. Beard). Boston: Ginn and Co., 1921 online edition
  .

  ; .

   (1st ed.); .

Articles

  , .
   (publication);  (article);  (article).
   (publication);  (article);  (article).
  .
  ; .
  .

   (publication);  (article);  (article).
   (publication);  (article).
   (24 volume book set);  (article).

  , ;  (volumes 1 & 2), .

 Reflections by other historians 
Historian Jay Green, in 1999, stated:

Jack Pole, an American history specialist from Britain, in 1972, skeptically remarked:

 Selected former students 

 James Thomson Shotwell (1874–1965)
 Francis William Coker (1878–1963)
 Edmund H. Oliver (1882–1935)
 Clara Woolie Mayer (1895–1988)
 Edgar Wallace Knight (1886–1953)
 Harry Elmer Barnes (1889–1968)
 Katharine DuPre Lumpkin (1897–1988)
 Preserved Smith, (1880–1941)

 Family 
James Harvey Robinson – on September 1, 1887, in Bloomington, Illinois – married Grace Woodville Read (1866–1927). They had no children. Robinson was a brother of botanist Benjamin Lincoln Robinson (1864–1935). By way of Robinson's wife's sister – Isabel Hamilton "Delle" Read (1858–1923), the second wife of John Lewis (1842–1921) – Robinson was an uncle to Read Lewis (1887–1984), a lawyer who, among other things, in 1921 founded the Foreign Language Information Service and in 1940 co-founded the literary magazine Common Ground.''

Bibliography

Annotations

Notes

References 
News media

 
 

  .
 

  ; ; .

  .
   (publication);  (article);  (article).
   (publication);  (article);  (article).

  ; .

  .

   (1st ed.); .
  ; ; .

 

Genealogical archives

  .

  ; .

Further reading

  ; ; .

   (publication);  (article);  (article);  (article).

   (publication);  (article);  (article);  (article);  (article).

External links

 
   (publication);  (article);  (article).
 
 
 

1863 births
1936 deaths
People from Bloomington, Illinois
Historians from Illinois
Historians of Europe
Writers from Bloomington, Illinois
Presidents of the American Historical Association
Harvard College alumni
Harvard University alumni
University of Freiburg alumni
Wharton School of the University of Pennsylvania faculty
Columbia University faculty
The New School faculty
Historians from New York (state)